Balanub is a rural locality (a selo) in Tlogobsky Selsoviet, Gunibsky District, Republic of Dagestan, Russia. The population was 117 as of 2010. There are 2 streets.

Geography 
Balanub is located 45 km northwest of Gunib (the district's administrative centre) by road, on the Kunada River. Kuker and Garbilazda are the nearest rural localities.

References 

Rural localities in Gunibsky District